Meishan railway station is a railway station located in Meishan town, Changxing County, Huzhou, Zhejiang, China, on the , which are operated by China Railway Shanghai Group.

History
Meishan railway station was built in 1960.

Culture
The station has been used in a number of films and television series, including: Railway Guerrilla, Entering a New Era, and The Battle at Lake Changjin.

References

Buildings and structures in Huzhou
Rail transport in Zhejiang
Railway stations in Zhejiang
1960 establishments in China